Đinh Phương Thành (born 3 September 1995) is a Vietnamese artistic gymnast.

He won the bronze medal in the men's parallel bars event at the 2014 Asian Games held in Incheon, South Korea. In 2015, he won four gold medals at the Southeast Asian Games held in Singapore. In 2018, he competed at the Asian Games held in Jakarta, Indonesia.

In 2019, he won the gold medal in the men's parallel bars and men's horizontal bars events at the Southeast Asian Games held in the Philippines. He also won the bronze medal in the men's pommel horse event.

References

External links 
 

Living people
1995 births
Sportspeople from Hanoi
Vietnamese male artistic gymnasts
Gymnasts at the 2014 Asian Games
Gymnasts at the 2018 Asian Games
Asian Games medalists in gymnastics
Medalists at the 2014 Asian Games
Asian Games bronze medalists for Vietnam
Southeast Asian Games medalists in gymnastics
Southeast Asian Games gold medalists for Vietnam
Southeast Asian Games silver medalists for Vietnam
Southeast Asian Games bronze medalists for Vietnam
Competitors at the 2015 Southeast Asian Games
Competitors at the 2017 Southeast Asian Games
Competitors at the 2019 Southeast Asian Games
Competitors at the 2021 Southeast Asian Games
Gymnasts at the 2020 Summer Olympics
Olympic gymnasts of Vietnam
20th-century Vietnamese people
21st-century Vietnamese people